"Make Me (Cry)" is the debut single recorded by American actress and singer Noah Cyrus. It features vocals from English producer, singer and songwriter Labrinth, and it was released on November 15, 2016. The song was written by Cyrus and Labrinth, with the production handled by the latter.

Background
In an interview with V, Cyrus said about the song: "It was really conversational. Lab[rinth] had a chorus, and then we started just going back and forth writing lyrics together. It turned into being about a toxic love and that's when I was like, 'Lab, there's no way I'm doing this without you.' It was so organic, and I think that shows in the video because it's very real. I think it's cool because they're asleep the whole time and you're trying to get into this person and they're just not listening to you. The video really explains the song."

Critical reception
 Teen Vogues De Elizabeth dubbed it a "gut-wrenching power-ballad that will resonate with anyone who has suffered a broken heart" and went on to say that "the song seems to reinforce the idea that sometimes you can be lonely even when you're in a relationship, and that being with someone can sometimes create more pain than being alone." Deepa Lakshmin of MTV claimed Noah's vocals "sound awfully similar to Miley's circa 2008. [Make Me (Cry)] is a song about love that's anything but easy," as well as calling it an "emotional duet" and "the perfect breakup song." E! Online's Kendall Fisher said the song is "way more different than most artist's first, pop inspired hit—including Miley's—as it follows a slower beat with a theme relating to toxic love and heartbreak." Ian David Monroe of V stated "while Cyrus may be young, the track itself feels anything but, with emotionally mature lyrics and an entirely adult sound. It is an impressive start for an artist with plenty of potentials, and lays the groundwork for a career to launch in any direction she chooses. With powerhouse vocals and a strong vision (attributes that seem to run in the family), Noah Cyrus may just have the music world at her fingertips."

Music video
A music video for the song, directed by Sophie Muller was released on November 22, 2016. De Elizabeth of Teen Vogue described the music video: "The video depicts the two singers waking up in their respective beds with their partners who are seemingly disinterested in their affection. In alternating shots, we see Noah's sadness, and then Labrinth's, and back again, as they sing about their significant others. As the song reaches its climax, the video goes into a split-screen so we can see Noah and Labrinth at the same time - and their raging around the apartment will give you major 'Wrecking Ball' vibes. The video ends in silence as Noah and Labrinth walk across their apartments, sitting down wordlessly."

As of January 2018, the music video on YouTube has amassed over 106 million views since its release on November 22, 2016.

Track listing

Charts

Certifications

Release history

References

2016 songs
Noah Cyrus songs
Labrinth songs
Music videos directed by Sophie Muller
Songs written by Labrinth
Song recordings produced by Labrinth
2016 debut singles
Songs written by Noah Cyrus
Male–female vocal duets
Torch songs
2010s ballads
Electropop ballads